Nicholas Michael "Nicky" O'Connell (born 15 September 1989) is an Irish hurler who played as a midfielder for the Clare senior team.

Born in Clonlara, County Clare, O'Connell first played competitive hurling during his schooling at Ardscoil Rís, Limerick. He arrived on the inter-county scene at the age of seventeen when he first linked up with the Clare minor team before later joining the under-21 side. He made his senior debut during the 2010 championship. Over the next few seasons O'Connell became a regular member of the starting fifteen and won one All-Ireland medal.

At club level O'Connell is a one-time championship medallist with Clonlara.

Throughout his career O'Connell made 22 championship appearances. He left the Clare panel in March 2015 but returned again in April 2015.

Honours

Team

Clonlara
Clare Senior Hurling Championship (1): 2008

Clare
All-Ireland Senior Hurling Championship (1): 2013
All-Ireland Under-21 Hurling Championship (1): 2009
Munster Under-21 Hurling Championship (1): 2009
National League (Division 1B) (1): 2012

References

1988 births
Living people
Clonlara hurlers
Clare inter-county hurlers
All-Ireland Senior Hurling Championship winners